Fontaneda may refer to:
 Fontaneda, Andorra, a village
 Galletas Fontaneda, a Spanish food company
 Hernando de Escalante Fontaneda (–after 1575), Spanish shipwreck survivor in Florida